Stromberg is a town in the district of Bad Kreuznach, in Rhineland-Palatinate, Germany. It is situated on the eastern edge of the Hunsrück, approximately 10 km west of Bingen.

Stromberg was the seat of the former Verbandsgemeinde ("collective municipality") Stromberg.

References

External links 
 https://en.db-city.com/Germany--Rhineland-Palatinate--Bad-Kreuznach--Stromberg

Bad Kreuznach (district)
Naheland